The 2013–14 Welsh Premier League (known as the Corbett Sports Welsh Premier League for sponsorship reasons) was the 22nd season of the Welsh Premier League, the highest football league within Wales since its establishment in 1992. The season began on 23 August 2013 and ended on 17 May 2014 with the Europa League play-off final.

The New Saints won the league after 29 games.

The league's rules are contained as a section of the Handbook of the Football Association of Wales.

Teams 

Llanelli were relegated out of the Welsh Premier League the previous season, while Rhyl were promoted as winners of the Cymru Alliance.

Stadia and locations

League table

Points deductions
Before the league season split into two, both Airbus UK Broughton and Aberystwyth Town both had a points deduction and fines given to them, with Airbus UK Broughton receiving a one-point deduction over a player registration, with Aberystwyth Town's ruling at a Disciplinary Panel meant they were deducted three points over playing a suspended player in a match against gap Connah's Quay.

Results 
Teams played each other twice on a home and away basis, before the league was split into two groups at the end of January 2014 - the top six and the bottom six.

Matches 1–22

Matches 23–32

Top six

Bottom six

UEFA Europa League play-offs
Teams who finished in positions third through sixth at the end of the regular season took part in play-offs to determine the second participant for the 2014–15 UEFA Europa League.

Semi-finals

Notes

Final

References

External links 

Cymru Premier seasons
1
Wales